Shankarapatnam is a mandal in Karimnagar district in the Indian state of  Telangana.

References 

Mandals in Karimnagar district